Herbert Nebe (11 May 1899 in Leipzig – 13 October 1985 in Gotha) was a German professional road bicycle racer. He is most known for his silver medal in the Elite race of the 1928 Road World Championships.

Palmares 

1927 - Diamant
 1st, Dresden Rundfarht
 10th, World Road Race Championship
1928 - Diamant
 1st, Berlin-Cottbus-Berlin
 1st, Bayern-Rundfahrt
  World Road Race Championship
 2nd, National Road Race Championship
1929 - Diamant
1930 - Brennabor

References

1899 births
1985 deaths
German male cyclists
Sportspeople from Leipzig
People from the Kingdom of Saxony
Cyclists from Saxony